Sergei Kuzhugetovich Shoigu (born 21 May 1955) is a Russian politician who has served as the minister of defence of Russia since 2012. Shoigu has served as the chairman of the Council of Ministers of Defense of the Commonwealth of Independent States since 2012.

Shoigu was the minister of emergency situations from 1991 to 2012. He briefly served as the governor of Moscow Oblast in 2012. A close confidant and ally of Vladimir Putin, Shoigu belongs to the siloviki of Putin's inner circle.

Early life and education 
Shoigu was born on 21 May 1955 in Chadan in the remote and impoverished Tuvan Autonomous Oblast to an ethnic Tuvan father, newspaper editor  (1921–2010) and a Ukrainian-born Russian mother, Alexandra Yakovlevna Shoigu (1924–2011). Alexandra Shoigu grew up in the Donbas town of Kadiivka and had traumatizing experiences while under detention of the German occupation forces during World War II. Later in her career she became member of the Tuva Regional Council of People's Deputies. Kuzhuget Shoigu rose to secretary of the Tuvan Regional Committee of the Communist Party, becoming a major figure in the Communist power structure of the republic.

After graduating from School No. 1 of Kyzyl city in the Tuvan ASSR, Shoigu studied at the Krasnoyarsk Polytechnic Institute. Shoigu graduated in 1977 with a degree in civil engineering.

Early career and first steps in CPSU 
Shoigu worked in construction projects nationwide for the next decade, advancing from low levels to become an executive. In 1988, Shoigu became a minor functionary in the Abakan branch of the Communist Party of the Soviet Union, and then in the Komsomol for a few years. In 1990, Shoigu moved to Moscow from Siberia, and was appointed deputy chairman of the State Architecture and Construction Committee of the Russian Federation, assisted by his father's connections. Future president Boris Yeltsin had held a similar position in the Construction Committee, and also come from a civil engineering and party background, and Shoigu thus gained Yeltsin's trust.

Minister of Emergency Situations (1991–2012) 

In 1991, Yeltsin appointed him head of the newly established Russian Rescue Corps, responsible for the rescue and disaster response system. The Rescue Corps replaced the previous Soviet civil defense system and soon absorbed the 20,000-strong militarized Civil Defense Troops of the Ministry of Defense, with Shoigu being appointed chairman of the State Committee of the Russian Federation for Civil Defense, Emergency Situations, and Disaster Response. Civil Defense remained a quasi-military organization in continuation of Soviet practice and Shoigu was politically involved, such as an unsuccessful attempt to evacuate Russian-backed Afghan President Mohammad Najibullah in 1992 and the intended distribution of weapons from the Civil Defense stocks to Yeltsin supporters during the October 1993 coup. In keeping with the militarized nature of Russian civil defense, Shoigu received the rank of major general in 1993, and was promoted swiftly to lieutenant general in 1995, colonel general in 1998, and to army general, in practice the highest Russian military rank, in 2003. The committee was renamed the Ministry of Emergency Situations (MChS) in 1994, making Shoigu a government minister. He became popular because of his hands-on management style and high visibility during emergency situations, such as floods, earthquakes and acts of terrorism. Under Shoigu, the responsibilities of the ministry were expanded to take over the Russian State Fire Service in 2002, making the MChS Russia's third-largest force structure.

In 1999 he became one of the leaders of the Russian pro-government party Unity, created by the Kremlin in opposition to the anti-Yeltsin elites of the Fatherland – All Russia alliance. Unity allowed for the rise of Vladimir Putin to President and in 2001 was combined into the ruling United Russia party, although Shoigu was the only delegate to vote against the merger. In 1999, Shoigu was awarded Russia's most prestigious state award: Hero of the Russian Federation.

Governor of Moscow Oblast (2012) 
With over twenty years of service as Minister of Emergency Situations, Shoigu established a close relationship with Vladimir Putin, and was rewarded by being appointed Governor of Moscow Oblast in 2012, taking office on 11 May of that year.

Minister of Defence (2012–present) 

On 6 November 2012, Shoigu was appointed Minister of Defence by Putin, succeeding Anatoly Serdyukov, who had implemented sweeping reforms of the Russian Armed Forces in response to performance in the Russo-Georgian War. According to expert Sergey Smirnov, the so called "Petersburg group" of siloviki (Sergei Ivanov, Sergey Chemezov and Viktor Ivanov) had wanted one of its associates to succeed Serdyukov, but Putin was reluctant to strengthen the clan and opted for the neutral Shoigu. As defence minister, Shoigu on multiple occasions has accompanied Putin during weekend breaks that the pair would spend at undisclosed locations in the Siberian countryside.

Serdyukov was unpopular with senior military leaders and seen by them as a civilian with no military background, something that Shoigu attempted to address by symbolically tying himself to the military through wearing an army general's uniform, reviving historical units dissolved under the reforms, and reinstating officials dismissed by Serdyukov. Furthermore, Shoigu appealed for support for reform within the army rather than taking a confrontational stance, appointed deputy ministers of defense from the military, and removed Serdyukov-appointed civilian tax service officials from the top echelons of the Ministry of Defense.

As defence minister, Shoigu continued aspects of Serdyukov's attempts at modernizing the Russian Armed Forces through reform. This included the creation of the Special Operations Forces Command to facilitate rapid intervention in conflicts within the perceived Russian sphere of influence and counterterrorism efforts. Serdyukov's goals of increasing the share of the Russian Armed Forces made up of professional contract servicemen rather than conscripts continued under Shoigu. However, the demographic challenge of a decreasing pool of military-aged and -eligible males forced him to increase national conscription quotas in early 2013, including even North Caucasians perceived as a security risk by authorities such as Chechens. This followed on from Serdyukov's initiatives of reducing available draft exemptions.

In November 2012, Shoigu decided to resurrect the tradition of Suvorov and Nakhimov cadets participating in the 9 May parade.

In July 2013 Shoigu ordered commanders to begin every morning in the barracks with a rendition of the Russian anthem, to compile an obligatory military-patriotic book reading list and to take responsibility for the preparation of demobilization albums (a type of memento scrapbook, which in Russian military tradition is given to conscripts upon completion of their service). In August 2013 he ordered all Defense Ministry civilian workers, other staff and management employees to wear uniforms.

In February 2014, Shoigu said Russia was planning to sign agreements with Vietnam, Cuba, Venezuela, Nicaragua, the Seychelles, Singapore, and several other countries either to house permanent military bases and/or to house airplane refueling stations in those countries. Over the next year, only an agreement with Vietnam was effectively signed.

Activities related to treaties and military exercises 

From early 2013 the Shoigu ministry made use of snap exercises as a means to ensure combat readiness of the Eastern Military District, the Western Military District, and the Central Military District. Already in 2015 western observers mentioned the Vienna Document while they spoke of "the deteriorating European security environment.. producing an action-reaction cycle involving Russia, NATO and other European countries, all seeking to demonstrate the readiness of their armed forces."

In March 2015 Russia under Shoigu's defence ministry halted all activities related to the Treaty on Conventional Armed Forces in Europe.

In October 2016 Shoigu hosted 56 representatives from 31 different OSCE nations, with Shoigu stating that the observers "had a chance to see with their own eyes that Russia had fully implemented its obligations on ensuring confidence and security in Europe". The observers were also shown new weapons deployed to the Russian Aerospace Force, Ground and Airborne Forces. The previous visit of the OSCE observers took place in 2011.

Activities related to the revolution in Ukraine 

In July 2014, Ukraine opened a criminal case against Shoigu. He was accused of helping to form "illegal military groups" in Eastern Ukraine who at the time fought against the Ukrainian army. The Ukrainian authorities alleged that Shoigu coordinated all of DPR Supreme Commander Igor Girkin's actions, supplying him and "other terrorist leaders" with "the most destructive weapons" since May and instructing him directly, with Putin's approval.

In July 2016 Shoigu said that he had "deployed more air defense systems in the southwest [of Russia]" and "also deployed a 'self-sufficient' contingent of troops in Crimea", adding "Since 2013 ... we have formed four divisions, nine brigades and 22 regiments. They include two missile brigades armed with Iskander missile complexes, which has allowed to boost fire power to destroy the potential adversary."

In July 2018 Shoigu warned that the Poroshenko administration of Ukraine was not fulfilling the Minsk agreements which were signed in order to end the war in Donbas.

Activities related to Syria 

On 30 September 2015, Russia began a military operation in Syria. The operation was carried out by the Russian Aerospace Forces, with the support of the Russian Navy and Bashar al-Assad's Syrian Armed Forces.

On 16 December 2015, speaking to the members of the State Duma behind closed doors, Shoigu mentioned the possibility of the Russian forces "reaching the Euphrates" in Syria.

In June 2016, Russia Today, while reporting minister Shoigu's visit to Hmeymim air base, showed RBK-500 ZAB-2.5SM incendiary cluster bombs being loaded onto Russian airplanes. After this information was discovered to be inconsistent with official Russian statements, the video was removed. It was later reinstated. An editorial note below the video made no mention of the weapon, saying a frame in the video has caused "concern for personnel safety" because of a pilot's close-up. "Upon re-evaluation it was deemed that the frame did not pose any risks; it had since been restored and the video is up in its original cut," the RT statement said.

On 11 December 2017, days after declaring Syria had been "completely liberated" from ISIL and with the campaign liberating the western bank of the Euphrates in its final days, Putin visited the Russian base in Syria, where he announced that he had ordered the partial withdrawal of the forces deployed to Syria. Several hours later, Shoigu said the troops had already begun to return.

On 26 December 2017, Shoigu said that Russia had set about "forming a permanent grouping" at the Tartus naval facility and the Hmeymim airbase, after Putin approved their structure and personnel strength. On the same day, the upper chamber of parliament approved the ratification of an agreement between Russia and Syria on expanding the Tartus naval facility, which envisages turning it into a full-fledged naval base.

On 17 September 2018, during multiple missile strikes by Israeli F-16 jets at targets in western Syria, Russia′s Il-20 ELINT reconnaissance plane returning to Khmeimim Air Base, with 15 Russian servicemen on board, was inadvertently downed by a Syrian S-200 surface-to-air missile. Russia′s defence minister the following day blamed Israel′s military for the accident and re-affirmed its stance in a minute-by-minute report presented on 23 September. Early on 20 September, Russia′s government-run news agency reported Russia had announced multiple areas of eastern Mediterranean ″near Syria, Lebanon, and Cyprus" shut for air and sea traffic until 26 September, due to the Russian Navy′s drills in the area. Following the shoot down incident, Shoigu on 24 September said that within two weeks, the Syrian army would receive S-300 air-defense missile systems to strengthen Syria′s combat air defence capabilities; a series of other military measures were announced such as radio-electronic jamming of "satellite navigation, onboard radars and communications systems used by military aircraft attacking targets in Syrian territory", in the areas of the Mediterranean off the Syrian coast.

Shoigu said in August 2021 that Russia had tested 320 new weapons over the course of its campaign in Syria.

In Medvedev government 

Shoigu was reappointed as defence minister in 2018 in the Medvedev second government.

In Mishustin government 
Shoigu was reappointed as defence minister in 2020 in the Mishustin government.

In an August 2021 "Solovyov Live" YouTube channel interview, Shoigu said referring to his tenure in the Ministry that "The requirements for fulfilling the defense procurement plan have risen dramatically. Over the past nine years, we have received 15,500 weapon systems for the ground forces. In 1999–2002, we had gotten 10 or 19 aircraft at best, that is, fixed- and rotary-wing aircraft all together. That's why now that we receive 140–150 aircraft annually, this is quite a different story."

In August 2021, Shoigu praised military cooperation between Russia and China.

Activities related to 2022 invasion of Ukraine 
On 29 August 2021, Shoigu was recorded as saying that "Russia doesn't consider Ukraine as threat," while he expressed the hope that the situation in Ukraine would ultimately change and the "nationalist mayhem" would be stopped. Shoigu said that the Ukrainians "are not just our neighbors, we are a single people."

On 11 February 2022, Shoigu met UK Defense Secretary Ben Wallace. Shoigu denied that Russia was planning an invasion of Ukraine. Wallace agreed at the meeting which also included General Valery Gerasimov that it was important to implement the Minsk agreements "as a clear way forward".

On 24 February 2022, Russia launched a large-scale military invasion of Ukraine. Shoigu said the purpose of the invasion "is to protect the Russian Federation from the military threat posed by Western countries, who are trying to use the Ukrainian people in the fight against our country." The sources say the decision to invade Ukraine was made by Putin and a small group of war hawks in Putin's inner circle, including Sergei Shoigu and Putin's national security adviser Nikolai Patrushev. In a 11 March video conference with Putin, Shoigu claimed that "everything is going to plan."

On 24 April, Putin decided to broadcast with English subtitles an 11-minute long Siege of Mariupol situation report meeting with Shoigu.

On 13 May, U.S. Secretary of Defense Lloyd Austin initiated a telephone conversation with Shoigu, the first call since 18 February. The call lasted about an hour with Austin urging an immediate ceasefire in Ukraine.

Also on 13 May, former FSB officer and former DPR Supreme Commander Igor Girkin harshly criticized Shoigu, accusing him of "criminal negligence" in conducting the invasion.

On 16 August, Shoigu said that Russia does not need to use nuclear weapons in Ukraine, as "its main purpose is to deter a nuclear attack. Its use is limited to extraordinary circumstances."

Shoigu and Putin attended the  military exercise in the Russian Far East. Beyond Russian troops, the exercises also included military forces from China, India, Mongolia and several post-Soviet states, among others. 

After large Ukrainian counteroffensives in September 2022, Igor Girkin said that Shoigu should be executed by firing squad. The Russia-installed governor of Ukraine's Kherson region Kirill Stremousov said in a video shared on social media that "Many are saying that the Defense Minister — who allowed things to come to this — should simply shoot himself like a [real] officer."
 	
On 21 September 2022, Shoigu said in a televised speech that Russia was not so much at war with Ukraine and the Ukrainian army as with the "collective West" and NATO.

In September 2022, Shoigu claimed that 5,397 Russian soldiers had been killed in the war in Ukraine. He said that the 2022 Russian mobilization is being carried out to control "already liberated territories" in Ukraine. According to Shoigu, it is planned to mobilize 300,000 reservists. Shoigu said the mobilized people could only be sent to combat zones after "training and combat coordination." However, some of the mobilized Russian men were killed less than two weeks after being drafted, meaning conscripted civilians are being sent to a combat zone without basic military training. On 28 October, Shoigu said that 82,000 mobilized reservists had already been deployed in the combat zone.

 
On 12 October 2022, the independent Russian media project iStories reported that more than 90,000 Russian soldiers had been killed, seriously wounded or gone missing in Ukraine, citing sources close to the Kremlin. 

On 23 October 2022, Shoigu said, without providing evidence, that Ukraine could escalate the war with a dirty bomb—or an explosive that contains radioactive waste material. The UK, US and French governments rejected what they called "Russia's transparently false allegations" against Ukraine, adding: "The world would see through any attempt to use this allegation as a pretext for escalation." 

On 1 November 2022, Shoigu admitted that the Russian military was destroying Ukrainian energy facilities. On 6 December 2022, he said that Russian forces are "inflicting massive strikes" on Ukraine. 

On 21 December 2022, Shoigu said that the war in Ukraine would continue in 2023 "until the tasks are completed". He declared that victory was "inevitable" and claimed that Russian troops were fighting what he called "neo-Nazism and terrorism".

Sanctions 
On 23 February 2022, the European Union considered Shoigu responsible for actively supporting and implementing actions and policies that undermine and threaten the territorial integrity, sovereignty and independence of Ukraine as well as the stability or security in Ukraine. Therefore the European Union added Shoigu to the list of natural and legal persons, entities and bodies set out in Annex I to Regulation (EU) No 269/2014.

On 25 February 2022, following Russia's invasion of Ukraine, the United States added Shoigu to the Specially Designated Nationals and Blocked Persons List.

On 28 February 2022, the Government of Canada "further amended its Special Economic Measures (Russia) Regulations to add eighteen members of the Security Council of the Russian Federation responsible for" Russian actions in the Ukraine, "including President Vladimir Putin, Foreign Minister Sergei Lavrov, Minister of Defence Sergei Shoigu, Minister of Justice Konstantin Chuychenko, and Finance Minister Anton Siluanov."

Personal life 
 
According to The Siberian Times, Shoigu is a polyglot who is known to speak eight languages other than Russian fluently, including English, Japanese, Chinese, Tuvan, and Turkish.

Family 

Sergei Shoigu was born to Kuzhuget Sereevich Shoigu (1921–2010) and Alexandra Yakovlevna Shoigu (née Kudryavtseva, 1924–2011). His father was born Shoigu Seree oglu Kuzhuget. His name order was changed because of a passport error, according to the Tuva official line. More likely, he Russified the name from Turkic oglu 'son of...'). Kuzhuget was an editor of a regional newspaper. He later worked in the Communist Party and for the Soviet authorities. He was the secretary of the Tuva Party Committee. He retired with the rank of first deputy chairman of the Council of Ministers of the Tuva ASSR.

Shoigu's father led the Tuvan State Archives. He spent six years as the editor of the newspaper Pravda. He wrote the novels Time and People, Feather of the Black Vulture (2001), Tannu Tuva: the Country of Lakes and Blue Rivers (2004).

Shoigu's mother Alexandra was born in the village of Yakovlev in the Oryol Oblast. From there, shortly before the Great Patriotic War, her family moved to Kadiivka in the Luhansk Oblast, Ukraine. A zootechnician, Alexandra was an Honored Worker of Agriculture of the Republic of Tuva. From 1979 she was the head of the Planning Department of the Ministry of Agriculture of the Republic. She was repeatedly elected deputy of the Supreme Soviet (parliament) of the Tuva ASSR. Sergei's great uncle, Seren Kuzhuget, was the commander of the Tuvan People's Revolutionary Army from 1929 to 1938.

Sergei has two sisters: Larisa Kuzhugetovna Shoigu (1953–2021), who was a deputy of the State Duma; and Irina Zakharova (born 1960), a psychiatrist.

Shoigu married Irina Alexandrovna Shoigu (née Antipina). She is president of the business tourism company Expo-EM. They have two daughters, Yulia (1977) and Kseniya (1991). According to Alexei Navalny, Kseniya is suspected to be a figurehead of her father in the ownership of a palace in the outskirts of Moscow, valued at about £12 million. In 2012, the estate was transferred to the formal ownership of Yelena Antipina. Following the Russian invasion of Ukraine, Kseniya posted a video on social media of her daughter and herself wearing the colours of the Ukrainian flag.

Hobbies 

Shoigu enjoys studying the history of Russia, especially Peter the Great's time and the era between 1812 and 1825 (which includes the French invasion of Russia and the Decembrist revolt).

Shoigu is fond of sports and is a fan of the CSKA Moscow hockey team. He enjoys football and is a fan of Spartak Moscow. In March 2016, together with Sergey Lavrov, Shoigu presented the Russia People's Soccer League, with aims to unite fans of the sport from all over Russia.

Shoigu collects Indian, Chinese, and Japanese swords and daggers. He enjoys bard songs and plays the guitar. He does water color paintings and graphics. He enjoys carpentry, and has shown some of his work to Putin.

Religion 
Shoigu stated in 2008 that he was baptized in the Russian Orthodox Church at the age of five, rebutting rumors that he was a practitioner of shamanism or Buddhism like many Tuvans.

Awards 
 Order of St Andrew with swords
 Hero of the Russian Federation
 Order of Merit for the Fatherland 1st class
 Order of Merit for the Fatherland 2nd class
 Order of Merit for the Fatherland 3rd class
 Order of Alexander Nevsky
 Order of Honour
 Order for Personal Courage (USSR)
 Medal "For the Return of Crimea"
 Medal Defender of a Free Russia
 Medal "In Commemoration of the 850th Anniversary of Moscow"
 Medal "In Commemoration of the 300th Anniversary of Saint Petersburg"
 Medal "In Commemoration of the 1000th Anniversary of Kazan"
 Three Medals "For Strengthening Military Cooperation" (Ministry of Defence)
 Medal "For Diligence in Engineering Tasks" (Ministry of Defence)
 Medal "200 Years of the Ministry of Defence" (Ministry of Defence)
 Medal of Great Awareness in Geo-political Affairs (Foreign Ministry)
 Medal "200 Years of the Ministry of Internal Affairs" (MVD)
 Medal "For Merit of the Stavropol Territory"
 Honoured Rescue Worker of the Russian Federation
 Order of Rightitude (Ministry of Internal Affairs – for services to being correct on the territory of the Russian Federation)
 Order of "Merit of the Altai Territory"
 Honorary Citizen of the Kemerov Oblast
 Honorary Citizen of the Tula Oblast
 Order "Danaker" (Kyrgyzstan)
 Order of Friendship (Kazakhstan)
 Order of the Serbian Flag 1st class
 Order of the Red Banner (Mongolia) 
 Order of the Union of Burma Sithu class

Notes

References

External links

|-

|-

|-

1955 births
Living people
Sergei
People from Dzun-Khemchiksky District
Defence ministers of Russia
Deputy heads of government of the Russian Federation
Governors of Moscow Oblast
Generals of the army (Russia)
Communist Party of the Soviet Union members
Soviet military personnel
Russian political party founders
Russian civil engineers
Russian people of Ukrainian descent
Tuvan people
Independent politicians in Russia
United Russia politicians
Anti-Ukrainian sentiment in Russia
Anti-Americanism
People of the annexation of Crimea by the Russian Federation
Pro-Russian people of the 2014 pro-Russian unrest in Ukraine
Russian military personnel of the 2022 Russian invasion of Ukraine
Specially Designated Nationals and Blocked Persons List
Russian individuals subject to European Union sanctions
Russian individuals subject to the U.S. Department of the Treasury sanctions
Heroes of the Russian Federation
Recipients of the Order "For Merit to the Fatherland", 2nd class
Recipients of the Order "For Personal Courage"
Recipients of the Order of Honour (Russia)
20th-century Russian politicians
21st-century Russian politicians
20th-century Russian military personnel
21st-century Russian military personnel